The 1919 San Diego mayoral election was held on April 8, 1919 to elect the mayor for San Diego. In the primary election, incumbent Mayor Louis J. Wilde, and A.P. Johnson Jr. received the most votes and advanced to the runoff. Wilde was then reelected mayor with a majority of the votes.

Candidates
Louis J. Wilde, Mayor of San Diego
A.P. Johnson Jr., businessman and former member of the San Diego City Council
Grant Conard, former Mayor of San Diego
Herbert Fay, former member of the San Diego City Council
Johnn Gillons, merchant
I. Isaac Irwin, banker

Campaign
Incumbent Mayor Louis J. Wilde stood for reelection. Wilde was challenged for reelection by a number of experienced local politicians including former city council member A.P. Johnson Jr., former city council member Herbert Fay, and former mayor Grant Conard. Also contesting the race were local merchant John Gillons and banker I. Isaac Irwin.

In the campaign, Wilde was accused of being an ineffective mayor, attending less than half of the meetings of Council, and allowing immoral behavior to thrive in San Diego. Wilde contested the allegations claiming that he had been unable to enact his preferred policies due to resistance from the Common Council. Johnson, head of the Southern Title Guaranty Company, attempted to run a "smokestack" industrial development campaign similar to what had worked for Wilde in the 1917 election.

On March 25, 1919, Wilde received the highest number of votes in the primary election, followed by Johnson. In the April 8, 1919 runoff between the Wilde and Johnson, Wilde received a majority was reelected mayor to a second term.

Primary Election results

General Election results

References

1919
1919 California elections
1919
1919 United States mayoral elections
April 1919 events